The Columbus Golden Seals were a minor league professional ice hockey team in the International Hockey League from 1971 to 1973. Columbus operated as a farm team to the National Hockey League's California Golden Seals. The owner of the NHL Seals, Charlie Finley, had acquired the IHL franchise rights to the dormant Columbus Checkers to create the farm team. In 1973, Finley sold the Columbus Golden Seals. The new owner, Al Savill, renamed the team the Columbus Owls for the 1973–74 season.

References

External links
 results and statistics (www.hockeydb.com)

International Hockey League (1945–2001) teams
Sports teams in Columbus, Ohio
Ice hockey teams in Ohio
Defunct ice hockey teams in Ohio
Ice hockey clubs established in 1971
Ice hockey clubs disestablished in 1973
1971 establishments in Ohio
1973 disestablishments in Ohio